Scuba Educators International (SEI) (also known as SEI Diving) is a non-for-profit underwater diving training organisation established in the United States during 2008 to continue the underwater diving training program known as the YMCA SCUBA Program which ceased operation in 2008.

Origins
SEI was founded in 2008 by a group of former senior YMCA SCUBA instructors following the announcement of the closure of the YMCA Scuba Program by the YMCA of the USA with the intention of continuing the YMCA Scuba Program under a new banner.  The new agency was conceived as being a non-for-profit organisation that would operate world-wide and in complete independence of the YMCA of the US, “but will continue to share philosophies and dedication to the highest quality education in the (diving) industry”.

Recognition
During 2010, SEI entered in an agreement with the Underwater Society of America (USOA) to issue CMAS International Diver Training Certificates.
SEI is a member of the  Diving Equipment and Marketing Association (DEMA) with its CEO, Tom Leaird, serving on the DEMA Board of Directors.

Qualifications
The SEI Qualification System was structured as of July 2014.
Snorkel
 Snorkeling for Families

Scuba
 I Tried Scuba
 Open Water Diver 
 Junior Open Water Diver
 Diver Refreshed
 Advanced Open Water Diver Level 2 
 Advanced Open Water Diver Level 3
 Master Scuba Diver Level 4 

Leadership
 Divemaster
 Assistant Instructor
 Instructor 
 Instructor Trainer 

Specialities
 DRAM (Dive Rescue & Accident Management) Rescue Diver
 Nitrox Diver
 Equipment Service
 Ice Diver
 Full Face Mask Diver 
 Reef Ecology
 Search and Recovery
 Dry Suit Diver

CMAS Equivalencies
The following equivalencies were agreed by the USOA and SEI during 2010.

References

External links
 SEI Diving Homepage
 SEI Diving Italy Homepage
 SEI Diving Japan Homepage
 SEI Diving Korea Homepage
 Scuba Educators International: The Short Documentary

Underwater diving training organizations
Organizations established in 2008
2008 establishments in the United States